Diplomatic relations between Georgia and Albania were established on 8 July 1993.
Both countries have a non resident ambassador based in Ankara, Turkey.

See also 
 Foreign relations of Albania 
 Foreign relations of Georgia

References

External links
 Ministry of Foreign Affairs of Georgia
 Ministry of Foreign Affairs of the Republic of Albania

 
Georgia
Bilateral relations of Georgia (country)